Statistics of Russian Top League in season 1995.

Overview
16 teams participated, and Spartak-Alania Vladikavkaz won the championship.

League standings

Results

Top scorers
25 goals
 Oleg Veretennikov (Rotor)

18 goals
 Aleksandr Maslov (Rostselmash)

16 goals
 Valeri Shmarov (Spartak Moscow)

14 goals
 /Vladimir Niederhaus (Rotor)

13 goals
 Oleg Garin (Lokomotiv Moscow)

12 goals
  Mikhail Kavelashvili (Spartak-Alania)

11 goals
 Yevgeni Kharlachyov (Lokomotiv Moscow)
 Oleg Teryokhin (Dynamo Moscow)

10 goals
  Garnik Avalyan (Krylya Sovetov)
 Timur Bogatyryov (Zhemchuzhina)
 Dmitri Karsakov (CSKA Moscow)
 Sergei Natalushko (Tekstilshchik)
  Mirjalol Qosimov (Spartak-Alania)
 Bakhva Tedeyev (Spartak-Alania)

Medal squads

See also
 1995 Russian First League
 1995 Russian Second League
 1995 Russian Third League

References
Russia - List of final tables (RSSSF)

Russian Premier League seasons
1
Russia
Russia